John William Smith (born August 9, 1965) is an American folkstyle and freestyle wrestler and coach. Smith was a two-time NCAA Division I national champion, and a six-time world level champion with two Olympic Championships and four World Wrestling Championships. Smith is the only American wrestler ever to win six consecutive World or Olympic championships as a competitor. At the end of his competitive career, Smith had won more World and Olympic gold medals in wrestling than any other American. Smith was widely known for his low single leg takedown, and is considered one of the greatest freestyle wrestlers of all time.

Wrestling career

High School
Smith wrestled at Del City High School in Del City, Oklahoma. While in high school Smith had a 105-5 record, and was a two-time Oklahoma state champion.

College
Smith competed collegiately at Oklahoma State University. While at Oklahoma State University, Smith's college career record was 154-7-2. At the NCAA Division I Wrestling Championships, Smith was a three-time national finalist and a two-time national champion. He finished his college career with 90 consecutive victories.

International
Beginning in his teenage years, Smith competed internationally in freestyle wrestling. Highlights of his career include four UWW World gold medals, and two Olympic gold medals. At the Senior level, his international freestyle wrestling record was 100-5. He is the only American wrestler to ever win six consecutive World or Olympic championships as a competitor.

Coaching career
Smith became the head wrestling coach at Oklahoma State University in 1991. During his tenure, Oklahoma State University won five NCAA Division I national team titles, with titles coming in 1994, 2003, 2004, 2005, and 2006. As of 2022, his overall dual meet record was 462-69-6. He had also coached 33 NCAA Division I individual national champions, and coached his wrestlers to 150 All-American honors. Smith has brought 21 team conference titles and 129 individual conference championships to Stillwater as a coach, as well.

Awards and honors

1992
 Summer Olympics
1991
 World Wrestling Championships
 Pan American Games
 Pan American Championships
1990
 World Wrestling Championships
 Grand Masters of Olympic Wrestling
UWW Master of Technique award winner
Amateur Athletic Union James E. Sullivan Award winner
1989
 World Wrestling Championships
1988
 Summer Olympics
 NCAA Division I
 Big Eight Conference
1987
 World Wrestling Championships
 Pan American Games
 Pan American Championships
 NCAA Division I
 Big Eight Conference
1986
 Goodwill Games
1985
 NCAA Division I
 Big Eight Conference

Other honors
 Smith was inducted into the National Wrestling Hall of Fame as a Distinguished Member in 1997.
 He was inducted into the Oklahoma Sports Hall of Fame with the class of 1997.
 In 2020, Smith was inducted into the Oklahoma Hall of Fame.
 The high school Smith graduated from, Del City High School in Oklahoma, named its field house after him.
 Smith has a wrestling move named after him, the John Smith low single.

Family
Smith's older brother Lee Roy Smith and younger brother Pat Smith are NCAA Division I national champions. Smith's youngest brother, Mark, was also a successful NCAA Division I wrestler, having placed in the top five nationally three times. Smith's nephews Mark Perry and Chris Perry are also NCAA Division I national champions. His son, Joe Smith, earned NCAA All-American honors twice while wrestling at Oklahoma State under his coaching. His nephew J. T. Realmuto is a Major League Baseball player.

See also
 List of Oklahoma State University Olympians

Bibliography
 Dellinger, Bob & Doris. 1994. The Cowboys Ride Again. Oklahoma Bylines Inc. 
 Zavoral, Nolan. 1997. A Season on the Mat. Simon & Schuster. 
 Hammond, Jairus K. 2005. The History of Collegiate Wrestling. National Wrestling Hall of Fame and Museum. 
 Moffat, James V. 2007. Wrestlers At The Trials. Exit Zero Publishing. 
 Parrish, Kim D. 2007. Cowboy Up. Oklahoma Heritage Association.

References

External links
 Wrestling Hall of Fame – Coach
 Wrestling Hall of Fame – Wrestler
 Collegiate Record – Wrestler
 Collegiate Record – Coach
 John Smith Videos-MatDaddy.com

1965 births
Living people
American male sport wrestlers
Olympic gold medalists for the United States in wrestling
Wrestlers at the 1988 Summer Olympics
Wrestlers at the 1992 Summer Olympics
Medalists at the 1988 Summer Olympics
Medalists at the 1992 Summer Olympics
Pan American Games gold medalists for the United States
World Wrestling Champions
Oklahoma State Cowboys wrestlers
Oklahoma State University
Oklahoma State Cowboys wrestling coaches
James E. Sullivan Award recipients
People from Del City, Oklahoma
Sportspeople from Oklahoma
Pan American Games medalists in wrestling
Wrestlers at the 1987 Pan American Games
Wrestlers at the 1991 Pan American Games
Goodwill Games medalists in wrestling
Competitors at the 1986 Goodwill Games
Competitors at the 1990 Goodwill Games
Medalists at the 1987 Pan American Games
Medalists at the 1991 Pan American Games